John Bird (1768-1829) was a Welsh landscape artist. He was born in Cardiff, where some of his works may be seen in the National Museum of Wales. Several of his drawings were published in 'Principal Seats of the Nobility' in 1787.

He died in Whitby in 1829.

References 

Welsh painters
Welsh male painters
Artists from Cardiff
Landscape artists
1768 births
1829 deaths